The Redwood Pioneers were a minor league baseball of California League. They were part of the California Angels farm system.  The Pioneers played in Rohnert Park, California during the early 1980s (1980–85). The team produced players such as Kirk McCaskill, Mark McLemore and Devon White.

Ballpark

The team originally played at a field adjacent to Mountain Shadows Middle School, and then at Rohnert Park Stadium when it was completed in 1981. The stadium was torn down in 2005.

Notable players

 Don Aase (1984) MLB All-Star
 Jack Howell (1984)
 Kirk McCaskill (1983)
 Mark McLemore (1984)
 Ed Ott 1983)
 Dick Schofield (1982)
 Devon White (1984) 7 x Gold Glove; 3 x MLB All-Star

References

External links
Rohnert Park at Baseball Reference

Defunct California League teams
 01
Sports in Sonoma County, California
Rohnert Park, California
Defunct baseball teams in California
California Angels minor league affiliates
1980 establishments in California
1985 disestablishments in California
Baseball teams established in 1980
Sports clubs disestablished in 1985